Mid-Anglia Radio PLC, was a company that owned radio stations in the Norfolk and Cambridgeshire regions of the UK.

The stations they owned were:

 Hereward Radio, in Peterborough (and, briefly, in Northampton as well).
 Worlds Greatest Music Station (or WGMS 1332) – in Peterborough.
 CN-FM 103, in Cambridge.
 KL.FM 96.7, in Kings Lynn, Norfolk.

History

In March/April 1994 Mid-Anglia Radio PLC was sold to Swindon based GWR Group, (now Global Radio) for £3.5M. It was said that Mid-Anglia Radio had made a loss of £12,186 for the year ending 30 September 1993.

After the GWR Group bought the Mid-Anglia Radio group of stations, a couple of stations were renamed. WGMS became Classic Gold 1332, which is now part of the Gold network, and CN-FM 103 became Q103.

Notes

Former British radio networks
Radio broadcasting companies of the United Kingdom